Magnesium hydroxide is the inorganic compound with the chemical formula Mg(OH)2. It occurs in nature as the mineral brucite. It is a white solid with low solubility in water. Magnesium hydroxide is a common component of antacids, such as milk of magnesia.

Preparation
Treating the solution of different soluble magnesium salts with alkaline water induces the precipitation of the solid hydroxide Mg(OH)2:
Mg2+  + 2OH−  → Mg(OH)2

As  is the second most abundant cation present in seawater after , it can be economically extracted directly from seawater by alkalinisation as described here above. On an industrial scale, Mg(OH)2 is produced by treating seawater with lime (Ca(OH)2). Ca(OH)2  is far more soluble than Mg(OH)2  and drastically increases the pH value of seawater from 8.2 to 12.5. The less soluble  precipitates because of the common ion effect due to the  added by the dissolution of :

Uses

Precursor to MgO
Most Mg(OH)2 that is produced industrially, as well as the small amount that is mined, is converted to fused magnesia (MgO).  Magnesia is valuable because it is both a poor electrical conductor and an excellent thermal conductor.

Medical
Only a small amount of the magnesium from magnesium hydroxide is usually absorbed by the intestine (unless one is deficient in magnesium). However, magnesium is mainly excreted by the kidneys; so long-term, daily consumption of milk of magnesia by someone suffering from kidney failure could lead in theory to hypermagnesemia. Unabsorbed magnesium is excreted in feces; absorbed magnesium is rapidly excreted in urine.

Applications

Antacid
As an antacid, magnesium hydroxide is dosed at approximately 0.5–1.5g in adults and works by simple neutralization, in which the hydroxide ions from the Mg(OH)2 combine with acidic H+ ions (or hydronium ions) produced in the form of hydrochloric acid by parietal cells in the stomach, to produce water.

Laxative
As a laxative, magnesium hydroxide is dosed at 5-10g, and works in a number of ways. First, Mg2+ is poorly absorbed from the intestinal tract, so it draws water from the surrounding tissue by osmosis. Not only does this increase in water content soften the feces, it also increases the volume of feces in the intestine (intraluminal volume) which naturally stimulates intestinal motility. Furthermore, Mg2+ ions cause the release of cholecystokinin (CCK), which results in intraluminal accumulation of water and electrolytes, and increased intestinal motility. Some sources claim that the hydroxide ions themselves do not play a significant role in the laxative effects of milk of magnesia, as basic solutions (i.e., solutions of hydroxide ions) are not strongly laxative, and non-basic Mg2+ solutions, like MgSO4, are equally strong laxatives, mole for mole.

History of milk of magnesia
On May 4, 1818, American inventor Koen Burrows received a patent (No. X2952) for magnesium hydroxide.  In 1829, Sir James Murray used a "condensed solution of fluid magnesia" preparation of his own design to treat the Lord Lieutenant of Ireland, the Marquess of Anglesey, for stomach pain. This was so successful (advertised in Australia and approved by the Royal College of Surgeons in 1838) that he was appointed resident physician to Anglesey and two subsequent Lords Lieutenant, and knighted. His fluid magnesia product was patented two years after his death, in 1873.

The term milk of magnesia was first used by Charles Henry Phillips in 1872 for a suspension of magnesium hydroxide formulated at about 8% w/v. It was sold under the brand name Phillips' Milk of Magnesia for medicinal usage.

USPTO registrations show that the terms "Milk of Magnesia" and "Phillips' Milk of Magnesia" have both been assigned to Bayer since 1995. In the UK, the non-brand (generic) name of "Milk of Magnesia" and "Phillips' Milk of Magnesia" is "Cream of Magnesia" (Magnesium Hydroxide Mixture, BP).

As food additive

It is added directly to human food, and is affirmed as generally recognized as safe by the FDA. It is known as E number E528.

Magnesium hydroxide is marketed for medical use as chewable tablets, as capsules, powder, and as liquid suspensions, sometimes flavored.  These products are sold as antacids to neutralize stomach acid and relieve indigestion and heartburn.  It also is a laxative to alleviate constipation. As a laxative, the osmotic force of the magnesia acts to draw fluids from the body. High doses can lead to diarrhea, and can deplete the body's supply of potassium, sometimes leading to muscle cramps.

Some magnesium hydroxide products sold for antacid use (such as Maalox) are formulated to minimize unwanted laxative effects through the inclusion of aluminum hydroxide, which inhibits the contractions of smooth muscle cells in the gastrointestinal tract, thereby counterbalancing the contractions induced by the osmotic effects of the magnesium hydroxide.

Other niche uses

Magnesium hydroxide is also a component of antiperspirant. Magnesium hydroxide is useful against canker sores (aphthous ulcer) when used topically.

Waste water treatment
Magnesium hydroxide powder is used industrially to neutralize acidic wastewaters. It is also a component of the Biorock method of building artificial reefs.

Fire retardant
Natural magnesium hydroxide (brucite) is used commercially as a fire retardant. Most industrially used magnesium hydroxide is produced synthetically.  Like aluminum hydroxide, solid magnesium hydroxide has smoke suppressing and flame retardant properties. This property is attributable  to the endothermic decomposition it undergoes at 332 °C (630 °F):

Mg(OH)2  → MgO  + H2O

The heat absorbed by the reaction retards the fire by delaying ignition of the associated substance. The water released dilutes combustible gases. Common uses of magnesium hydroxide as a flame retardant include additives to cable insulation, insulation plastics, roofing, and various flame retardant coatings.

Mineralogy

Brucite, the mineral form of Mg(OH)2 commonly found in nature also occurs in the 1:2:1 clay minerals amongst others, in chlorite, in which it occupies the interlayer position normally filled by monovalent and divalent cations such as Na+, K+, Mg2+ and Ca2+. As a consequence, chlorite interlayers are cemented by brucite and cannot swell nor shrink.

Brucite, in which some of the Mg2+ cations have been substituted by Al3+ cations, becomes positively charged and constitutes the main basis of layered double hydroxide (LDH). LDH minerals as hydrotalcite are powerful anion sorbents but are relatively rare in nature.

Brucite may also crystallize in cement and concrete in contact with seawater. Indeed, the Mg2+ cation is the second most abundant cation in seawater, just behind Na+ and before Ca2+. Because brucite is a swelling mineral, it causes a local volumetric expansion responsible for tensile stress in concrete. This leads to the formation of cracks and fissures in concrete, accelerating its degradation in seawater.

For the same reason, dolomite cannot be used as construction aggregate for making concrete. The reaction of magnesium carbonate with the free alkali hydroxides present in the cement porewater also leads to the formation of expansive brucite.

MgCO3 + 2 NaOH → Mg(OH)2 + Na2CO3

This reaction, one of the two main alkali–aggregate reaction (AAR) is also known as alkali–carbonate reaction.

See also
 Portlandite – calcium hydroxyde:

References

Antacids
Laxatives
Food acidity regulators
Hydroxides
Magnesium compounds
E-number additives